Daniel Sesma (born 18 June 1984) is a Spanish former road cyclist. He rode in the 2011 Giro d'Italia, finishing 149th overall.

Major results
2008
 1st Stage 1 Vuelta a Navarra

References

External links

1984 births
Living people
Spanish male cyclists
Sportspeople from Pamplona
Cyclists from Navarre